Phạm Thu Hằng (born 1984 in Hanoi, Vietnam) was the winner of Miss Hanoi-Vietnam 2005 (Miss Vietnam Universe 2005). She competed in Miss Universe 2005 but did not place. She studied at Trade Manager University.

Miss Hanoi-Vietnam 2005
The winner: Phạm Thu Hằng
1st runner-up : Phạm Thị Thùy Dương ( Top 10 Miss Vietnam and had completed in Miss International 2007 )
2nd runner-up : Nguyễn Thái Hà (competed Miss Tourism Queen International 2009)
Phạm Thu Hằng was winner of special award (Best Physique)

Miss Universe 2005
She had completed Miss Universe 2005 in Thailand but did not reach the Top 15.

References

1984 births
Living people
Miss Universe 2005 contestants
People from Hanoi
Vietnamese beauty pageant winners